Marie de Lorraine (15 August 1615 – 3 March 1688) was the daughter of Charles de Lorraine, Duke of Guise and Henriette Catherine de Joyeuse and the last member of the House of Guise, a branch of the House of Lorraine.

Biography

Marie de Lorraine de Guise was a "foreign princess naturalized in France" (that is, the daughter of a foreign prince of a junior branch of the House of Lorraine). After the death of the last male of the House of Guise in 1675, Marie became duchess of Guise, duchess of Joyeuse, and princess of Joinville and enjoyed the vast revenues from these duchies and principalities. People addressed her formally as "Your Highness"; she signed legal documents as "Marie de Lorraine"; and after 1675, as "Marie de Lorraine de Guise", but she ended personal letters with "Guise".

Exiled to Florence with her family, 1634–43, Marie (whom the French knew as "Mademoiselle de Guise") became close to the Medicis and came to love Italy and especially Italian music. For over forty years scarcely a week passed that she did not write to her Medici friends in Florence, or receive word from them through the Tuscan resident in Paris. Circa 1650 she morganatically married Claude de Bourdeille, comte de Montrésor by whom she had several children whose existence was never acknowledged publicly but whom she occasionally threatened to acknowledge if she did not get her way.

As guardian for her nephew, Louis Joseph, Duke of Guise, she was preoccupied with returning the House of Guise to its former glory. This meant giving the young man a fine residence and a prestigious bride. In 1666 Marie therefore commissioned Jacques Gabriel (the father of royal architect Jacques Gabriel) to carry out extensive renovations for the family's urban residence, known as the Hôtel de Guise. She also ordered a total reworking of the garden by the famous garden designer, André Le Nôtre. The old stable wing that stretched along the garden was also renovated and subdivided into comfortable apartments to be occupied by what might be likened to today's artists and intellectuals in residence: Philippe Goibaut, Roger de Gaignières, and, a bit later,  Marc-Antoine Charpentier.

For a bride, Marie de Lorraine aimed high and was victorious: Elisabeth d'Orléans, Louis XIV's first cousin, whose high rank outweighed the unsightliness of her crooked back. The marriage was celebrated on 5 May 1667. The newly-weds settled down into their splendid apartment on the "noble" floor of the Hôtel de Guise and Marie de Lorraine lodged in her ground-floor apartment just below them.

Starting in 1670, Marc-Antoine Charpentier began composing for the three Guises, sometimes singing haute-contre lines. Mlle de Guise protected him and advanced his career by soliciting commissions from people or establishments who were seeking her continued patronage. Indeed, for eighteen years her patronage fostered a number of major works, most of them devotional and strongly influenced by Italian music. For example, she was probably one of the "enraged virgins" and "heroines" who swooped down on Molière in late 1672 and forced him to give Charpentier the chance to write the music for Molière's the forthcoming theatrical spectacle, the Malade Imaginaire.

In 1671 her nephew Louis Joseph, Duke of Guise died. She and the young widow fought over who would be guardian of the late Duke's little son, François Joseph, the last male of the House of Guise. Marie de Lorraine won the battle, but her guardianship was short-lived. The little boy died in 1675.

Henceforth, as the last member of the House of Guise, she used her vast wealth not only to live splendidly but for projects dear to her heart. In a cartouche beneath her portrait by Mignard, above, a solitary tree stands in a forest of stumps, to indicate her position as last survivor. A Latin motto makes the parallel explicit: Succisas dat conjectare superstes, "The survivor bears witness to the fallen."

After these two closely spaced deaths, Marie turned to devotion. With the help of Father Nicolas Barré, Minim, she founded a teachers' training institute and created schools for girls and hospitals for the poor in her Parisian parish and in her provincial lands. In her vast Parisian residence known as the "Hôtel de Guise," she presided "magnificently" over a select little "court" composed chiefly of members of the House of Lorraine, clergy, learned protégés, and Italians passing through Paris. Music (often Italian and Italian-style music) was the principal entertainment at these events.

Although her relations were often frosty with Louis Joseph's widow, known to her contemporaries as "Madame de Guise", the two women continued to see one another, both in Paris and at the abbey of Saint Pierre de Montmartre, where Marie's sister Renée was abbess and where Élisabeth's sister, Marguerite Louise d'Orléans, the erstwhile Grand Duchess of Tuscany, resided after 1675. Both Guise women had private apartments at Montmartre.

In the early 1670s, Marie had begun to assemble a small ensemble of household musicians to perform pieces by a variety of French and Italian composers, among them Marc-Antoine Charpentier. Then, in the early 1680s she enlarged the group, until it rivaled both in size and quality the ensembles maintained by "several sovereigns." Over the years she made her composer and her musicians available to her nephew's widow, Mme de Guise, for performances in churches and at the royal court.

In a will intended to disinherit her niece, la Grande Mademoiselle (that is, Anne Marie Louise d'Orléans, Duchess of Montpensier) Marie de Lorraine gave the Hôtel de Guise to Charles François de Stainville, count of Couvonges, in 1688. Pressure exerted by her heirs caused the will to be broken by the Parlement of Paris in 1689.

In 1700, the Hôtel de Guise was sold to François, Prince of Soubise and his wife Anne de Rohan-Chabot and became the Hôtel de Soubise. Only a few fragments of the Hôtel de Guise survive within the vast buildings and gardens of the Hôtel de Soubise, which currently houses the Archives nationales.

Notes

Further reading
Patricia M. Ranum, Portraits around Marc-Antoine Charpentier (Baltimore, 2004), pp. 346–378, 426–454.
Inventory of furnishings at the Hôtel de Guise (1688), "Inventaires des meubles précieux de l'Hôtel de Guise ...," Revue de l'art français, 3e série, 13 (1896), will and inventory of Marie de Lorraine, pp. 200–233.
Charles V. Langlois, Les Hôtels de Clisson, de Guise et de Rohan-Soubise au Marais (Paris, 1922), pp. 13–121.
Philippe Béchu and Christian Taillard, Les Hôtels de Soubise et de Rohan-Soubise, Marchés de construction et de décor (Paris, 2004), pp. 274–283.
Insights into Mlle de Guise’s personality and preoccupations are provided by letters written by her or people in her entourage:
her concern about receiving the honors due her rank
her relaxed and familiar correspondence with Secretary Gondi in Florence
her joy during a trip to Champagne
her way of choosing paintings for her gallery
how she decorated the table for a sumptuous banquet

1615 births
1688 deaths
107
Marie
Nobility from Paris
French suo jure nobility
French duchesses
Marie
Marie
Marie
17th-century French people